Now is the fourteenth studio album by British band Jade Warrior. Released on 30 June 2008 on the WindWeaver label, it comes after a 15-year gap since their previous album, Distant Echoes.

Track listing
All tracks written by Jade Warrior, except where noted.

 "Fool and His Bride" - 7:36
 "Journey" - 5:52 (Jade Warrior, Colin Henson)
 "Lost Boys" - 7:05
 "Tall Trees" - 3:56
 "Floating Moon" - 2:18
 "3am Meltdown" - 4:21
 "True Love" - 5:47 (Jade Warrior, Tim Stone)
 "Talisman" - 3:05
 "Screaming Dreams" - 4:54
 "Everything Must Pass" - 6:04

Personnel
 Jon Field - flutes, percussion, keyboards
 Glyn Havard - vocals, additional guitar
 Dave Sturt - basses, percussion, keyboards

Guest musicians
 Tim Stone - guitars
 Jeff Davenport - drums
 Theo Travis - saxes
 Chris Ingham - piano
 Lottie Field - woodwinds
 Sam Ryde - piano
 Carol Bellingham - backing vocals
 Gowan Turnbull - saxes, contrabass clarinet
 Brian Imig - Remiclud

2008 albums
Repertoire Records albums
Jade Warrior (band) albums